Darrin Patrick (December 4, 1970 – May 7, 2020) was an American author and teaching pastor at Seacoast Church in Charleston, South Carolina. He was a pastor of The Journey, a fellowship of churches in St. Louis, Missouri, which he founded in 2002. He served as the chaplain to the St. Louis Cardinals and was the author of several books. A prominent figure within New Calvinism, he was the vice-president of the Acts 29 Network, an international church planting organization, and a council member of The Gospel Coalition.

He died by suicide in May 2020.

Personal background 
Patrick was born in Marion, Illinois. He became a Christian while in high school, where he was an all-conference, all-area catcher on the baseball team. After beginning a successful ministry in high school, he pursued pastoral training rather than a college baseball career. He earned a Bachelor of Arts in Bible and Biblical Languages from Southwest Baptist University (1994), graduated summa cum laude from Midwestern Baptist Theological Seminary (M.Div., 1997), and received a Doctor of Ministry degree from Covenant Theological Seminary (2010). He married in 1993 and had four children.

Ministry 
Patrick moved from suburban Kansas City, Missouri to St. Louis in 2002 to plant The Journey in the urban core. The church has seen unprecedented growth in the city of St. Louis and the broader metropolitan region. The Journey is now a multi-site ministry with 6 churches in Missouri and Illinois, including Patrick's hometown of Marion. The church has been scrutinized for its cultural engagement by the Missouri Baptist Convention and received national media attention regarding one of its outreach ministries, "Theology at the Bottleworks," for being held at Schlafly Bottleworks, a brewery in Maplewood, MO.

In his role as the chaplain to the St. Louis Cardinals, Patrick regularly led chapel services and Bible studies during the baseball season. He was present for the players either before or after home games. Shortly after the end of the 2013 season, Patrick officiated the wedding of Cardinals pitcher Shelby Miller. As a chaplain, Patrick was a part of Baseball Chapel, an international ministry recognized by Major and Minor League Baseball, which is responsible for the appointment and oversight of all team chapel leaders (over 500 throughout professional baseball).

Patrick was a vice-president of the Acts 29 Network, and was a council member of The Gospel Coalition, a group of Reformed Evangelical leaders from around the United States, including D. A. Carson, Tim Keller, and John Piper. He has written for Christianity Today and The Leadership Journal,  and contributed to The Resurgence blog. He has been interviewed by The Christian Post. He has also appeared on Fox & Friends, and has been discussed by The New York Times, the St. Louis Post-Dispatch, and BBC News Online.

Removal from ministry 
On April 13, 2016, it was announced that the Board of Elders of The Journey had removed Patrick from his position and required him to step down from all internal and external leadership positions. The reasons given were "pastoral misconduct" and a "historical pattern of sin". A letter from the elders made it clear that the misconduct did not involve adultery, but there was a violation of the "high standard for elders in marriage through inappropriate meetings, conversations, and phone calls with two women". In addition, the historical sins were listed and included lack of self-control, manipulation and lying, domineering, misuse of power, and refusal of personal accountability. The elders indicated that they had raised these issues with Patrick over a period of a few years, but he had repeatedly failed to address them. Patrick's name was removed from The Gospel Coalition's council and the board of directors of the Acts 29 Network. His disciplining was reported in the Christian press. In a conference in Las Vegas, in 2017, Patrick talked about the lessons he learned in losing his church.

Restoration to ministry 
After a restoration process led by Seacoast Church Founding Pastor Greg Surratt, Patrick joined the staff of Seacoast in June 2017 as a teaching pastor. He cofounded The Pastors Collective podcast with Greg Surratt in 2019. Patrick led Enneagram intensives as a coach through Crosspoint Ministries. He also worked with The Association of Related Churches (ARC), coaching pastors on building a healthy culture.

Death
Patrick died on May 7, 2020 in Pacific, Missouri of a self-inflicted gunshot wound while target shooting.

Books 

Patrick, Darrin; Patrick, Amie (2015). The Dude's Guide to Marriage: Ten Skills Every Husband Must Develop to Love His Wife Well. Thomas Nelson. ISBN 978-1-4002-0549-3.

Contributions

References

External links 
Seacoast Church

1970 births
2020 deaths
People from Marion, Illinois
Writers from Illinois
Midwestern Baptist Theological Seminary alumni
Southwest Baptist University alumni
Suicides by firearm in Missouri
Place of death missing
American evangelicals
American Protestant ministers and clergy
Covenant Theological Seminary alumni
2020 suicides